Tropanserin (INN; MDL-72,422) is a drug which acts as a potent and selective 5-HT3 receptor antagonist. It was investigated in clinical trials for the treatment of migraine in the 1980s but was never marketed.

Synthesis
Tropanserin can be prepared by the reaction of tropine with 3,5-dimethylbenzoyl chloride.

See also 
 Bemesetron
 Zatosetron
 Ricasetron
 Granisetron
 Tropisetron

References 

5-HT3 antagonists
Benzoate esters
Tropanes